Byron Patrick Hurt (born December 31, 1969) is an American activist, lecturer, writer, and award-winning documentary filmmaker. In 2010, he hosted the Emmy-nominated television show, Reel Works with Byron Hurt. His documentary Hip-Hop: Beyond Beats and Rhymes premiered at the 2006 Sundance Film Festival and broadcast nationally on PBS in 2007. His film Soul Food Junkies received the Best Documentary Award at the 2012 American Black Film Festival and aired on PBS' Independent Lens in January 2013.

Hurt is currently working on his new documentary Hazing: How Badly Do You Want In, an exploration on the culture of hazing following the tragic hazing deaths of young people.

Biography
Byron Hurt attended Northeastern University to study Journalism. While attending Northeastern, Hurt played football as a quarterback,  and founded God Bless the Child Productions before graduating in 1993. Upon graduation he was hired by the university's Center for the Study of Sport in Society to help form the Mentors in Violence Prevention (MVP) program with the purpose of educating young black men about gender and sexual violence. This experience led Hurt to produce and direct the documentary I Am A Man: Black Masculinity in America. Hurt is also the former associate director of the United States Marine Corps gender violence prevention program. On September 30, 2006, Byron Hurt married Kenya Felice Crumel at their home in Plainfield, New Jersey.

Filmography
Moving Memories: The Black Senior Video Yearbook
I Am A Man: Black Masculinity in America
Hip-Hop: Beyond Beats and Rhymes
Barack & Curtis: Manhood, Power, & Respect
Soul Food Junkies

References

External links
 Official website
 
 Byron Hurt on YouTube
 "Soul Food Junkies" (2013)
 "Barack & Curtis: Manhood, Power, & Respect" (2008)
 "Hip-Hop: Beyond Beats and Rhymes" (2006)
 "I Am A Man: Black Masculinity in America" (1998)

American documentary film directors
American documentary film producers
Documentary films about hip hop music and musicians
Living people
Writers from Plainfield, New Jersey
1969 births
Film directors from New Jersey
Film producers from New Jersey
African-American film directors
21st-century African-American people
20th-century African-American people